Damascus International Airport  is the international airport of Damascus, the capital of Syria. Inaugurated in the mid-1970s, it also was the country's busiest airport. In 2010, an estimated 5.5 million passengers used the airport, an increase of more than 50% since 2004.

History

The construction of the airport was entrusted in 1965 to a group of French companies (SCB, CSF, Spie and Cegelec), led by the SCB.

In the late 1980s, the airport had robust air service. Over 30 airlines were operating to the city, offering nonstop flights to various destinations in Europe, North Africa, the Middle East, and South Asia. Pakistan International Airlines even connected Damascus twice a week with New York JFK via Frankfurt, with three-class B747-300 aircraft.

In March 2007, Iran Air inaugurated a direct connection between Damascus and South America. For a brief period, the airline flew to Caracas using Boeing 747s before its partner Conviasa began plying the route instead. Flights initially originated in Tehran. By early 2011, Conviasa had added a stop in Madrid to the flight. Venezuelan President Hugo Chávez commented in 2012 that Damascus remained one of Conviasa's destinations, although he did not mention whether the service still operated via Madrid.

Since the onset of the Syrian Civil War, the airport and the road leading to it have been closed intermittently and most international airlines have ceased flights. Several airlines such as Emirates and EgyptAir with former regular service to Damascus have cancelled their flights to Damascus. British Midland International and British Airways stopped flying to Damascus in May 2012 as well, while Royal Jordanian stopped in July 2012. In November and December 2012, intense fighting was reported around the airport, prompting a two-day closure.

On 20 May 2022, as part of ongoing Israeli attacks on Syria, Israel launched a missile attack on a Syrian military position close to the airport, killing three Syrian soldiers. Several Israeli missiles were also reportedly shot down by Syrian air defence systems. Some flights were also canceled as a result of the attack.

On 11 June 2022, Damascus International Airport suffered major damage, including to runways, following an Israeli missile attack. Flights were halted to and from the airport in June for nearly two weeks due to the extensive damage to infrastructure. 

On 2 January 2023, Damascus International Airport temporarily went out of service after an Israeli missile strike. The airport reopened after 7 hours and continued service.

Facilities

Terminals

The airport is of Islamic architecture, and has two terminals, one for international flights and the other for domestic flights. The airport features two duty-free outlets. The departures hall also includes an in-house coffee shop, several souvenir shops, three restaurants, and a lounge for first and business class passengers. The southern part of the airport has hardened aircraft shelters and artillery revetments.

The construction of a third terminal is planned but its construction has been postponed due to the events of the civil war, this should increase the capacity of the airport to 16 million passengers per year.

Runways
Current runways allow the landing of virtually all types of aircraft currently in use in the world (including Airbus A380, Boeing 787 Dreamliner and Boeing 747-8). The airport has two vertical runways (05/23L and 05/23R), which were completely renovated in the 2010s.

Ground transportation
Located 30 km (20 miles) southeast of Damascus, the facility is connected to the city by a highway. A shuttle bus runs between the city center and the airport. The building of a railway line and a terminal bus station with a shopping center at the airport is planned to connect it to the Hejaz station.

Airlines and destinations

Accidents and incidents
On 20 August 1975, ČSA Flight 540 crashed while on approach to Damascus International Airport. Out of the 128 passengers and crew on board, there were only two survivors.

References

External links

Airport at the flightradar24.com

Airports in Syria
Buildings and structures in Damascus
1970 establishments in Syria
Airports established in 1970